Gamble Rogers Memorial State Recreation Area is a  Florida State Park in Flagler Beach, Florida, United States, between the Atlantic Ocean and the Intra-Coastal Waterway on State Route A1A.

Naming 
The park is named for Gamble Rogers, a Florida folk singer. On October 10, 1991, Rogers was camping in the area. In response to a child's plea for help, he attempted to rescue a Canadian tourist in the heavy surf and riptides of Flagler Beach. Both Rogers and the tourist drowned. The park was created by the Florida legislature in honor of this Florida folk singer/guitarist.

Recreational activities
Activities include coastal camping, picnicking, swimming, paddleboarding, eco-tours, fishing, and beachcombing. Visitors can also enjoy sunbathing, bicycling, canoeing, boating, and wildlife viewing. Between May and early September, loggerhead, green and leatherback sea turtles are among the wildlife of the park.

Amenities include 34 campsites overlooking the Atlantic Ocean, boat ramp and boat basin with access to the Intracoastal Waterway, picnic tables, a large picnic pavilion, a mile long nature trail, the beach and hiking trails.

Hours
Florida state parks are open between 8 a.m. and sundown every day of the year (including holidays).

Gallery

External links
 Gamble Rogers Memorial State Recreation Area at Flagler Beach at Florida State Parks
 Gamble Rogers Memorial State Recreation Area at Absolutely Florida
 Gamble Rogers Memorial State Recreation Area at Wildernet

Parks in Flagler County, Florida
State parks of Florida